Fabrício de Souza or simply Fabrício (born 5 July 1982) is a Brazilian footballer who plays for Vasco da Gama, as a defensive midfielder.

Biography
In February 2006 he left for Júbilo Iwata. In January 2008, he was loaned to Cruzeiro along with Henrique. In January 2009 the deal became  permanent. He signed a 3-year contract with club.

Club statistics

Honours
Corinthians
Tournament Rio – São Paulo: 2002
Brazilian Cup: 2002
São Paulo State League: 2003
Brazilian League: 2005

Cruzeiro
Minas Gerais State League: 2008, 2009, 2011

References

External links

Brazilian footballers
Campeonato Brasileiro Série A players
Campeonato Brasileiro Série B players
J1 League players
União São João Esporte Clube players
Sport Club Corinthians Paulista players
Júbilo Iwata players
Cruzeiro Esporte Clube players
São Paulo FC players
CR Vasco da Gama players
Brazilian expatriate footballers
Expatriate footballers in Japan
Brazilian expatriate sportspeople in Japan
Sportspeople from Santa Catarina (state)
1982 births
Living people
Association football midfielders